The 9th Parliament of Lower Canada was in session from January 15, 1817, to February 9, 1820. Elections to the Legislative Assembly in Lower Canada had been held in March 1816. All sessions were held at Quebec City.

References

External links 
  Assemblée nationale du Québec (French)
Journals of the House of Assembly of Lower Canada ..., John Neilson (1817)

09
1817 establishments in Lower Canada
1820 disestablishments in Lower Canada